Udalrich of Olomouc (also known as Ulrich, ; ; 1134 – 18 October 1177) was Duke in Hradec Králové (eastern Bohemia) from 1152 till 1153 and between 1173–1177 ruled the appanage of Olomouc (as Duke of Olomouc), one of three ducal regions in Moravia, then part of the Duchy of Bohemia.

Family 
Born as a member of the Přemyslid dynasty, a younger son of Duke Sobeslaus I and his wife Adelaide (daughter of Prince Álmos of Hungary). Name Oldřich wore as the third in his dynasty. Both of Udalrich′s brothers, Sobeslaus II and Wenceslaus II became the Dukes of Bohemia; his sister Maria was Margravine of Austria and Duchess of Bavaria by marriage.

Life 
Allegedly, Udalrich promised Emperor Frederick Barbarossa in 1152 a large sum of money if Barbarossa would enfeoff Udalrich rather than his cousin Vladislaus II with the Duchy of Bohemia. After an intervention by Bishop Daniel I of Prague, all parties agreed that Vladislaus II would be Duke of Bohemia (in 1158 he became the second King of Bohemia) and Udalrich would receive Hradec Castle (present-day city of Hradec Králové) along with the surrounding region.

The agreement did not last long, and Udalrich fled into exile in Poland, and from there to the Emperor's court, where he was active from 1162 as a loyal supporter of the Emperor. He participated in several of Barbarossa's Italian campaigns.

King Vladislaus II abdicated in 1172 in favour of his son Frederick; nevertheless this act – until then unusual – met with strong resistance of Bohemian nobles and even the Emperor reject to acknowledge Frederick as rightful ruler. The following year he dethroned him and throne of Bohemia was offered to Ulrich. However, Udalrich declined the honour (because he wanted to keep seniority principle established in Přemyslid dynasty already in the mid of 11th century) and renounced the rule over Bohemia in favour to his elder brother Sobeslaus II. Grateful brother rewarded him by reign in the most important part of Moravia, i.e. the Duchy of Olomouc.

Udalrich married twice. His first wife was Cecilia, the daughter of Landgrave Louis I of Thuringia. His second wife was Sophia, the daughter of Margrave Otto II of Meissen.

Ancestry

References

External links 
 Genealogie-mittelalter.de

1134 births
1177 deaths
Přemyslid dynasty
Medieval Bohemian nobility
Bohemian princes
12th-century Bohemian people